HD 31529, also known as HR 1584, is a solitary, orange hued star located in the southern constellation Caelum, the chisel. It has an apparent magnitude of 6.09, making it faintly visible to the naked eye if viewed under ideal conditions. Eggen (1989) lists it as a member of the old disk population.

This is an evolved red giant star with a stellar classification of K3 III. It is currently on the red giant branch, generating energy by fusing hydrogen in a shell around its core. It has 4.8 times the mass of the Sun and an enlarged radius of  due to its evolved state.

References

Caelum
K-type giants
31529
1584
CD-39 01691
022847
13883466
Caeli, 22